Hubertus Albers (born 27 September 1965), better known under his pseudonym Atze Schröder, is a German comedian. He is best known for playing the main character in the RTL comedy show Alles Atze (2000–2007) and for his appearances in the ProSieben stand-up comedy show . He appears as himself in the 2008 German comedy film .

Comedic style 
Atze Schröder always appears in character with a large brown wig and glasses which he cultivated for his appearance on Quatsch Comedy Club and Alles Atze. His comedic style has been described as "vulgar" and centers around his self-assured "Proll" (simple working class) persona living in the industrial Ruhr area of Germany.

Personal life 
Atze Schröder has been particular of only appearing in character in public and never revealing anything from his private life. However, his real name became public record in 1998, when Hubertus Albers registered the name "Atze Schröder" at the German Patent and Trade Mark Office. On 13 July 2007, the trademark was signed over to ""  (Schröder, Atze real name Albers, Hubertus) from Emsdetten. This trademark was deleted on 1 November 2017.

Despite this, the comedian has repeatedly sued against the reveal of his real name, including in 2007 against Wikimedia Deutschland's then president for use on the German Wikipedia which led to the editorial decision to remove the real name. After an altercation with Niels Ruf in 2015, Ruf sued Schröder under his real name which led German tabloid Bild to use his real name in an article in 2016. Schröder in turn sued Bild for the use of his real name but lost in January 2018 which led to another mention. The court argued that Schröder invited the use of his real name because he started the altercation with Ruf as a private person and not in his Atze Schröder persona.

Tours 
 1998: Nur so geht's
 1999: Lecker
 2001: Meisterwerke
 2003: Goldene Zeiten
 2005: Atze im Wunderland
 2006: Kronjuwelen
 2007: Mutterschutz
 2009: Revolution
 2011: Schmerzfrei
 2013: Und dann kam Ute
 2014: Richtig fremdgehen 
 2016: Turbo
 2019: Echte Gefühle

Awards 
2000: Deutscher Comedypreis – Best Comedy Act for Alles Atze
2003: Deutscher Comedypreis – Best Actor in a Comedy Show for Alles Atze
2003: Deutscher Fernsehpreis – Best Sitcom for Alles Atze
2005: Deutscher Comedypreis – Best Comedy Series for Alles Atze

References

External links

 

Comedy theatre characters
Theatre characters introduced in 1998
Male characters in theatre
Living people
1965 births
German male comedians
20th-century German male actors
21st-century German male actors
Pseudonymous artists
ProSieben people
RTL Group people